The 1974–75 Idaho State Bengals men's basketball team represented Idaho State University during the  NCAA Division I men's basketball season.

The Bengals were led by fourth-year head coach Jim Killingsworth and played their home games on campus at the ISU Minidome in Pocatello.

Sophomore center Steve Hayes was named to the all-conference team; senior guard Kevin Hoyt was on the second team and senior guard George Rodriquez was honorable mention.

References

External links
Sports Reference – Idaho State Bengals – 1974–75 basketball season

Idaho State Bengals men's basketball seasons
Idaho State
Idaho State